Palmiriella neumanni is a species of wasp found in Australia. It was initially described as Mikeius neumanni in 2008 by Matthew Buffington. In a 2011 revision, the species was moved to the newly erected monotypic genus Palmiriella.

References 

Cynipoidea